is a Japanese freelance illustrator and character designer.

She began her career with the video game company Compile. During her time at Compile, she designed the characters for the company's DiskStation games Apple Sauce: Anoko to Natsu Matsuri and Float Land no Otogi Banashi, and illustrated numerous projects for the company.

She later left Compile and became a freelance illustrator, working on numerous projects, including illustrating light novels and designing games for companies such as Sting. In 2005, she provided the character designs to the anime series Zettai Shōnen.

Works
Dengeki PlayStation (illustration of frontispiece, Dengeki yonkoma, cover)
Puyo Puyon (key animation, CG)
Chocolate Kiss (character design, key illustrations)
Reveal Fantasia (character design, illustrations)
Kyō no Wanko (character design and illustrations)
Zettai Shōnen (original character design)
Dept. Heaven Series (Episodes I, II and IV)
Orusu Banshee (illustrations)
Concerto Gate (character design)

Duan Surk (illustrations)
Summon Night: Twin Age ~Seiri-tachi no Koe~ (character design)
Hexyz Force (character design)
Jinrui wa Suitaishimashita (illustrations)

Sources:

References

External links
FRAGILE —her official website
Sunaho Tobe's Twitter

Anime character designers
Living people
Year of birth missing (living people)